The Worshipful Company of Broderers is one of the livery companies of the City of London. Broderers were workers in embroidery; the organization of Broderers existed in at least 1376, and was officially incorporated by a royal charter in 1561. As the craft of embroidery has lost its importance as a trade, the company has become less of a trade association for broderers. Instead, the company is now, as are most livery companies, a charitable foundation.

The company is the forty-eighth in the order of precedence for livery companies. Its motto is Omnia Desuper, Latin for All From Above.

The livery hall of the Broderers, Broderers' Hall, stood on Gutter Lane from 1515 until its destruction in the London blitz. The Broderers now dine in Mercers' Hall.

References

External links
Official site

1561 establishments in England
English embroidery
B